Nele Bayn (born 6 January 2000) is a German slalom canoeist who has competed at the international level since 2017.

She won a silver medal in the C1 team event at the 2022 World Championships in Augsburg.

References

External links

Living people
German female canoeists
2000 births
Medalists at the ICF Canoe Slalom World Championships